Scott Buckley (born 13 June 2000) is an Irish rugby union player for Munster in the United Rugby Championship and Champions Cup. He plays as a hooker and represents UCC in the amateur All-Ireland League.

Early life
Buckley attended Christian Brothers College and captained the school to victory in the 2019 Munster Schools Rugby Senior Cup, scoring the crucial try that secured a 5–3 win against fierce rivals Presentation Brothers College in the final and a record 30th cup for Christians.

Munster
Buckley had a series of strong performances for Munster A during the 2019–20 Celtic Cup, and captained the side in their 36–10 away defeat against Dragons A in August 2019, though a hamstring injury meant that he missed the majority of the campaign. Buckley joined the Munster academy ahead of the 2020–21 season. Following the disruption caused by the province's recent tour to South Africa, Buckley made his senior competitive debut for Munster in their opening 2021–22 Champions Cup fixture away to English club Wasps on 12 December 2021, scoring a try and earning the player of the match award in the province's 35–14 away win. He joined Munster's senior squad on a two-year contract from the 2022–23 season.

Ireland
Buckley has represented Ireland at under-18 and under-19 level.

References

External links

Munster Academy Profile

2000 births
Living people
People from Kinsale
People educated at Christian Brothers College, Cork
Rugby union players from County Cork
Irish rugby union players
University College Cork RFC players
Munster Rugby players
Rugby union hookers